Phyllonorycter encaeria is a moth of the family Gracillariidae. It is known from South Africa, where it has been recorded from Pretoria and the suburbs of Cape Town.

Adults are on wing from early January to late February and again from late September to mid-November.

References

Endemic moths of South Africa
Moths described in 1911
encaeria
Moths of Africa